Ali Ismayilov (born May 8, 1974) is a boxer from Azerbaijan and the current WBO Latino Cruiserweight champion.

Amateur
Ismayilov won the bronze medal at light heavyweight at the 1999 World Amateur Boxing Championships in Houston, Texas. He won a bronze medal at the European Amateur Boxing Championships, followed by early loss at the 2000 Olympics.

Ismayilov qualified for the 2004 Summer Olympics by ending up in first place at the 4th AIBA European 2004 Olympic Qualifying Tournament in Baku, Azerbaijan. He then participated in the 2004 Summer Olympics in Athens, Greece. There he defeated Washington Silva but lost in the second round of the Light heavyweight (81 kg) division by Greece's Elias Pavlidis.

Pro
He turned pro as a cruiser and is 11-1 as of 2007, his loss a stoppage by Vadim Tokarev. He became Golden belt champion in 2008 when he defeated Luciano Torres.

References

External links

Yahoo! Sports

1974 births
Living people
Azerbaijani male boxers
Cruiserweight boxers
Boxers at the 2000 Summer Olympics
Boxers at the 2004 Summer Olympics
Olympic boxers of Azerbaijan
Sportspeople from Donetsk
AIBA World Boxing Championships medalists